Ailam or Ailum is a town and a nagar panchayat in Shamli district in the Indian state of Uttar Pradesh.

Demographics
At the 2001 census of India, Ailam had a population of 13,052.  2011 Census of India, the population had declined to 12,110 people across 2199 households. Males constitute 54% of the population and females 46%, and there is an average literacy rate of 67%. Ailum is the birth place of educationist Dr Vipin Verma who has started Digital India mission in rural part of india and operating from west delhi, Dr vipin has been awarded with many national awards from CSC and IIT (Indian Institute of Technology).

References 

Cities and towns in Shamli district